This is a list of state leaders in the 4th century (301–400) AD.

Africa

Africa: East

Kingdom of Aksum (complete list) –
Aphilas, King (f. early 4th century)
Wazeba, King (f. early 4th century)
Ousanas, King (c.320)
Ezana, King (c.333–c.356)
MHDYS, King (c.350)
Ouazebas, King (f. late 4th century)
Eon, King (c.400)

Americas

Americas: Mesoamerica

Mexico

Teotihuacan –
Spearthrower Owl, Emperor (374–439)

Maya civilization

Tikal (complete list) –
Sihyaj Chan K'awiil I, Ajaw (c.307)
Unen Bahlam, Ajaw (c.317)
K'inich Muwaan Jol, Ajaw (?–359)
Chak Tok Ich'aak I, Ajaw (c.360–378)
Yax Nuun Ahiin I, Ajaw (c.379–404)

Asia

Asia: Central
Monɡolia
Rouran Khaganate (complete list) –
Yujiulü Mugulü, Tribal Chief (4th century)
Yujiulü Cheluhui, Tribal Chief (4th century)
Yujiulü Tunugui, Tribal Chief (4th century)
Yujiulü Bati, Tribal Chief (4th century)
Yujiulü Disuyuan, Tribal Chief (4th century)
Yujiulü Pihouba, Tribal Chief (4th century)
Yujiulü Wenheti], Tribal Chief (4th century)
Yujiulü Heduohan, Tribal Chief (?-402)

Asia: East
China
Western Jin, China (complete list) –
Hui, Emperor (290–307)
Sima Lun, Emperor (301)
Huai, Emperor (307–311)
Min, Emperor (313–316)

Eastern Jin, China (complete list) –
Yuan, Emperor (317–323)
Ming, Emperor (323–325)
Cheng, Emperor (325–342)
Kang, Emperor (342–344)
Mu, Emperor (344–361)
Ai, Emperor (361–365)
Fei, Emperor (365–372)
Jianwen, Emperor (372)
Xiaowu, Emperor (372–396)
An, Emperor (396–419)

Later Liang –
Lü Guang, Emperor (386–400)
Lü Shao, Emperor (400)
Lü Zuan, Emperor (400–401)
Lü Long, Emperor (401–403)

Later Qin –
Yao Chang, Emperor (384–393)
Yao Xing, Emperor (394–416)

Later Yan –
Murong Chui, Emperor (384–396)
Murong Bao, Emperor (396–398)
Lan Han, Emperor (398)
Murong Sheng, Emperor (398–401)

Northern Liang –
Duan Ye, Prince (397–401)

Northern Wei –
Emperor Daowu, Emperor (386–409)

Southern Liang –
Tufa Wugu, Prince (397–399)
Tufa Lilugu, Prince (399–402)

Western Liang –
Li Gao, Prince (400–417)

Western Qin –
Qifu Gangui, Prince (388–400)

Southern Yan –
Murong De, Prince (398–405)

Japan
Japan, Yayoi period (complete list) –
Ōjin, Emperor (270–310)
Nintoku, Emperor (313–399)
Richū, Emperor (400–405)

Korea
Baekje (complete list) –
Bunseo, King (298–304)
Biryu, King (304–344)
Gye, King (344–346)
Geunchogo, King (346–375)
Geungusu, King (375–384)
Chimnyu, King (384–385)
Jinsa, King (385–392)
Asin, King (392–405)

Geumgwan Gaya (complete list) –
Geojilmi, King (291–346)
Isipum, King (346–407)

Goguryeo (complete list) –
Micheon, King (300–331)
Gogug-won, King (331–371)
Sosurim, King (371–384)
Gogug-yang, King (384–391)
Gwanggaeto, King (391–413)

Silla (complete list) –
Heulhae, King (310–356)
Naemul, King (356–402)

Asia: Southeast

Cambodia
Funan (complete list) –
Zhāntán, King (c.357)

Indonesia
Indonesia: Java

Salakanagara –
Dewawarman VII, King (early 4th century)
Dewawarman VIII, King (early 4th century–362)

Tarumanagara (complete list) –
Jayasingawarman, King (358–382)
Dharmayawarman, King (382–395)
Purnawarman, King (395–434)

Indonesia: Kalimantan (Borneo)
Kutai Martadipura –
Kudungga, King (mid 4th century)
Asvavarman, King (late 4th century)
Mulavarman, King (c.400)

Malaysia: Peninsular

Kedah Sultanate (complete list) –
Durbar Maharaja I, Maharaja (c.330–390)
DiMaharaja Putra, Maharaja (c.390–440)

Vietnam
Champa (complete list) –
Fan Yi, King (c.284–336)
Fan Wen, King (336–349)
Fan Fo, King (349–380)
Bhadravarman I, King (380–413)

Asia: South

Northeast India

Kamarupa: Varman dynasty (complete list) –
Pushyavarman, King (350–374)
Samudravarman, King (374–398)
Balavarman, King (398–422)

India

Western Ganga dynasty (complete list) –
Konganivarman Madhava, King (350–370)
Madhava, King (370–390)
Harivarman, King (390–410)

Gupta Empire (complete list) –
Ghatotkacha, King (c.280–319)
Chandragupta I, Emperor (c.320–335)
Samudragupta, Emperor (c.335–375)
Ramagupta, Emperor (c.375–380)
Chandragupta II, Emperor (c.380–413/15)

Kadamba dynasty: Banavasi (complete list) –
Mayurasharma, Maharaja (345–365)
Kangavarma, Maharaja (365–390)
Bhageerath, Maharaja (390–415)

Kushan Empire (complete list) –
Vasudeva II, Ruler/Emperor (c.275–310)
Chhu, Ruler/Emperor (c.310?–325?)
Shaka I, Ruler/Emperor (c.325–345)
Kipunada, Ruler/Emperor (c.345–375)

Western Satraps (complete list) –
Visvasena, Satrap (293–304)
Rudrasimha II, Satrap (304–348)
Yasodaman II, Satrap (317–332)
Rudradaman II, Satrap (332–348)
Rudrasena III, Satrap (348–380)
Simhasena, Satrap (380–384/5)
Rudrasena IV, Satrap (382–388)
Rudrasimha III, Satrap (388–395)

Vakataka dynasty (complete list) –
Pravarasena I, King (270–330)
Pravarapura–Nandivardhana branch
Rudrasena I, King (330–355)
Prithivishena I, King (355–380)
Rudrasena II, King (380–385)
Prabhavatigupta, Regent (385–405)
Divakarasena, King (385–400)
Damodarasena, King (400–440)
Vatsagulma branch
Sarvasena, King (330–355)
Vindhyasena, King (355–400)
Pravarasena II, King (400–415)

Pakistan

Kushano-Sasanian Kingdom (complete list) –
Hormizd II, Kushanshah (300–303)
Peroz II, Kushanshah (303–330)
Varahran, Kushanshah (330–365)

Sri Lanka

Anuradhapura Kingdom (complete list) –
Mahasena, King (277–304)
Sirimeghavanna, King (304–332)
Jettha Tissa II, King (332–341)
Buddhadasa, King (341–370)
Upatissa I, King (370–412)

Asia: West

Persia

Persia: Sasanian Empire (complete list) –
Narseh, Shahanshah, King of Kings (293–302)
Hormizd II, Shahanshah, King of Kings (302–309)
Adur Narseh, Shahanshah, King of Kings (309)
Shapur II, Shahanshah, King of Kings (309–379)
Ardashir II, Shahanshah, King of Kings (379–383)
Shapur III, Shahanshah, King of Kings (383–388)
Bahram IV, Shahanshah, King of Kings (388–399)
Yazdegerd I, Shahanshah, King of Kings (399–420)

Europe

Europe: Balkans
Roman Empire: East/ Byzantine Empire (complete list) –
Diocletian
Emperor in civil war (284–285)
Sole Emperor (285–286)
Eastern Emperor (286–305)
Galerius
Eastern Caesar (293–305)
Eastern Emperor (305–311)
Maximinus II
Eastern Caesar (305–308)
Eastern Emperor (310–312)
Licinius
Western Emperor (308–313)
Eastern Emperor (313–324)
Constantine I
Western Caesar (306–312)
Western Emperor (312–324)
Sole Emperor (324–337)
Constantius II
Eastern Emperor (337–350)
Sole Emperor (350–361)
Julian
Western Emperor (355–361)
Sole Emperor (361–363)
Jovian, Sole Emperor (363–364)
Valens
Eastern Emperor (364–378)
Theodosius I 
Eastern Emperor (379–392)
Emperor (392–395)
Arcadius 
Junior Emperor (383–395)
Eastern Emperor (395–408)

Europe: British Isles
Ireland
Ireland (complete list) –
These kings are generally thought historical, but dates are uncertain and naming some High Kings may be anachronistic or inaccurate.
Niall Noígíallach, High King (generally thought historical: 4th–5th century)
Nath Í, High King (4th–5th century)

Europe: Central

Alamannia, tribal kingdoms (complete list) –
Chrocus, leader (fl.260–306)
Mederic, petty king (early 4th century)
Chnodomarius, petty king (pre-350–357)
Gundomadus, petty king (fl.354–357)
Agenaric, petty king (fl.357)
Suomarius, petty king (fl.357–358)
Hortarius, petty king (fl.357–359)
Vestralpus, petty king (fl.359)
Urius, petty king (fl.359)
Ursicinus, petty king (fl.359)
Macrianius, petty king (fl.359)
Hariobaudes, petty king (fl.359)
Vadomarius, petty king (fl.359)
Rando, petty king (fl.368)
Vithicabius, petty king (360–368)
Priarius, petty king (?–378)

Vandals (complete list) –
Wisimar, King (?–335)
Godigisel, King (359–407)

Europe: East

Bosporan Kingdom (complete list) –
Theothorses, client king under Rome (279–309)
Rhadamsades, client king under Rome (309–322)
Rhescuporis VI, client king under Rome (314–341)

Europe: Southcentral
Roman Empire: West (complete list) –
Maximian
Caesar (285–286)
Western Emperor (286–305)
Constantius Chlorus
Western Caesar (293–305)
Western Emperor (305–306)
Severus
Western Caesar (305–306)
Western Emperor, in civil war (306–307)
Maxentius, Western Emperor, in civil war (306–312)
Licinius
Western Emperor (308–313)
Eastern Emperor (313–324)
Constantine I
Western Caesar (306–312)
Western Emperor (312–324)
Sole Emperor (324–337)
Crispus, Caesar (317–326)
Constantine II, Emperor of Gaul, Britannia, and Hispania (337–340)
Constans I
Emperor of Italy and Africa (337–340)
Western Emperor (340–350)
Constantius II
Eastern Emperor (337–350)
Emperor (350–361)
Magnentius, usurper Emperor (350–353)
Decentius, usurper Caesar (350–353)
Vetranio, Co-Emperor (350)
Julian
Western Emperor (355–361)
Sole Emperor (361–363)
Jovian, Sole Emperor (363–364)
Valentinian I, Western Emperor (364–375)
Gratian
junior Western Emperor (367–375)
Western Emperor (375–383)
Valentinian II
junior Western Emperor (375–383)
Western Emperor (383–392)
Magnus Maximus, usurper Emperor (383–388) 
Eugenius, Western Emperor (392–394)
Theodosius I 
Eastern Emperor (379–392)
Sole Emperor (392–395)
Honorius, Western Emperor (395–423)
Stilicho, power behind the throne (395–408)

Eurasia: Caucasus
Armenia: Arsacid dynasty (complete list) –
Tiridates III, client King under Rome (287–330)
Khosrov III, client King under Rome (330–339)
Tiran VII, client King under Rome (339–c.350)
Arsaces II (Arshak II), client King under Rome (c.350–368)
Interregnum under Sasania 
Pap, client King under Rome (370–374)
Varazdat, client King under Rome (374–378)
Arsaces III (Arshak III), client King under Rome (378–387)
Vologases III, client King under Rome, Co-Ruler (378–386)
Khosrov IV, client King under Rome (387–389)
Vramshapuh, client King under Rome (389–417)

Kingdom of Iberia (Kartli) (complete list) –
Mirian III, King (284–361)
Sauromaces II, King (361–363)
Aspacures II, King (363–365)
Mihrdat III, King (365–380)
Aspacures III, King (380–394)
Trdat, King (394–406)

See also
List of political entities in the 4th century

References 

Leaders
 
-